Opération Sentinelle is a French military operation with 10,000 soldiers and 4,700 police and gendarmes deployed since the aftermath of the January 2015 Île-de-France attacks, with the objective of protecting the deemed sensitive "points" of the territory from terrorism. It was reinforced during the November 2015 Paris attacks, and is part of a state of emergency in France due to continued terror threats and attacks, until the state of emergency ended on 1 November 2017.

Background
Opération Sentinelle was first deployed after the January 2015 Île-de-France attacks, and was reinforced following the November 2015 Paris attacks, attacks which were claimed to have been perpetrated by the Islamic extremist groups Al-Qaeda in the Arabian Peninsula and Islamic State of Iraq and the Levant. A number of other attacks have taken place in France since these attacks.

Other European countries have also deployed soldiers to protect certain areas due to terror threats or attacks, including in Belgium, Italy, and the United Kingdom (Operation Temperer).

Attacks against soldiers
On at least six occasions, soldiers involved in the nationwide operation have themselves been targeted.

Soldiers deployed under Opération Sentinelle on 3 February 2017 blocked the assailant in the Louvre machete attack from entering the museum, where he claims to have intended to deface art with spray paint as a symbolic attack on France; he attacked the patrolling soldiers with a machete.

In the March 2017 Île-de-France attacks, two Opération Sentinelle soldiers at Orly Airport killed a man who said "I am here to die for Allah" while he beat to the floor another member of their team, a soldier from whom the attacker intended to steal her assault rifle.

On 9 August 2017 in Levallois-Perret, six soldiers of the 35th Infantry Regiment participating in Opération Sentinelle were intentionally wounded by an automobile whose driver fled. The military did not get the chance to use their weapons in-time.

See also 
 Operation Vigilant Guardian – Belgian equivalent
 Operation Temperer – British equivalent
 Sentinelle 2021 Film

References

External links 

 
 

 
2010s in Paris
Counterterrorism in France
Islamic terrorism in France
January 2015 Île-de-France attacks
Military operations involving France
November 2015 Paris attacks
Police raids on Islamists